The 2004 Sundance Film Festival was held in Utah from January 15, 2004 to January 25, 2004. It was the 20th edition of the Sundance Film Festival, a program of the Sundance Institute.

Non-competition features

Midnight
 Azumi
 Freshman Orientation
 Grand Theft Parsons
 High Tension
 Overnight
 The Park
 The Raspberry Reich
 Saw

Awards 
The award show took place on January 24 and was presented by actors Zooey Deschanel and Jake Gyllenhaal.

 Dramatic Grand Jury Prize: Primer.
 2004 Alfred P. Sloan Prize: Primer.

See also 

 List of Sundance Film Festival award winners

References

2004
2004 film festivals
2004 in American cinema
2004 festivals in the United States
January 2006 events in the United States